Denise Elizabeth Bender (born July 29, 1959) is an American former soccer defender who was a member of the 1985 United States women's national soccer team. She was the first captain of the USWNT in its history and played in its first international game in Italy in August 1985. She played college soccer for Washington State and Washington.

Personal life
Bender was born to Karen and Dean Bender, and has an identical twin sister, Laurie Bender, who also played soccer. Denise Bender earned a master's degree in industrial hygiene and a Bachelor of Science in chemistry from the University of Washington. She worked as an environmental health and safety director at Amgen. Bender married Traci Lyn Brown on February 14, 2013, in King County, Washington.

Career statistics

International

References

Further reading
 Grainey, Timothy (2012), Beyond Bend It Like Beckham: The Global Phenomenon of Women's Soccer, University of Nebraska Press, 
 Lisi, Clemente A. (2010), The U.S. Women's Soccer Team: An American Success Story, Scarecrow Press, 
 Nash, Tim (2016), ''It's Not the Glory: The Remarkable First Thirty Years of US Women's Soccer', Lulu Press,

External links
Player interview

1959 births
Living people
American women's soccer players
Women's association football defenders
United States women's international soccer players
Washington State University alumni
Washington State Cougars women's soccer players
University of Washington alumni
Washington Huskies women's soccer players
Twin sportspeople
Soccer players from Seattle